U with double acute may refer to:

U with double acute (Cyrillic) (Ӳ, ӳ), a Chuvash letter, regarded as a separate letter from У
U with Double acute accent (Ű, ű), a Hungarian letter, regarded as a separate letter from U